Bennett's woodpecker (Campethera bennettii) is a species of bird in the family Picidae. It is found in woodlands and bushes in Africa. The International Union for Conservation of Nature (IUCN) has assessed it as a least-concern species.

Taxonomy
This species was described by Andrew Smith in 1836. Two subspecies are recognised: Campethera bennettii bennettii and C. b. capricorni. The common name and Latin binomial commemorate the British naturalist Edward Turner Bennett. Bennett's woodpecker, the fine-spotted woodpecker, the Nubian woodpecker and the speckle-throated woodpecker form a superspecies.

Description
The male's forehead, crown and nape are red. The chin and throat are white. The upperparts are brown, yellow and white. The underparts are pale yellow, and there are dark spots on the breast and flanks. The eyes are red, the beak is grey, and the legs are bluish-green or grey-green. The female has a black forehead with white spots, and its ear coverts and throat are brown or blackish-brown. The juvenile bird has a black forehead and crown and darker upperparts. The subspecies capricorni is slightly larger, and its underparts have a deeper colour and fewer spots.

Distribution and habitat
This woodpecker is found in Angola, Botswana, Burundi, Democratic Republic of the Congo, Eswatini, Malawi, Mozambique, Namibia, Rwanda, South Africa, Tanzania, Zambia, and Zimbabwe, and it has a patchy distribution. Its habitat is woodlands and bushes, including miombo, Baikiaea, Acacia and mopane woodlands.

Behaviour
Bennett's woodpecker is found singly, in pairs or in family groups. It mostly forages on the ground, either bare or with short grass, and also feeds in trees. It mostly eats ants and termites, including their eggs. Breeding occurs from August to February. The woodpecker excavates or reuses holes in trees. Three eggs are laid and then incubated for 15 to 18 days.

Status
The species has a stable population and there is no evidence of substantial threats, so the IUCN has assessed it as a least-concern species.

Gallery

References

External links
Image at ADW

Bennett's woodpecker
Birds of Southern Africa
Bennett's woodpecker
Taxonomy articles created by Polbot